The Dora Mavor Moore Award for Outstanding New Play is an annual award celebrating achievements in Toronto theatre.

For most of the Dora Awards' history, separate awards have been presented for best play and best musical. For part of the 1990s, however, the two awards were merged with both musicals and dialogue-based plays competing in a single category.

Awards and nominations

References

External links
 Toronto Alliance for the Performing Arts - Doras

 
Canadian dramatist and playwright awards